Lewis Charlton may refer to:
 Lewis de Charleton, medieval Bishop of Hereford
 Lewis Charlton (slave), American slave